La Ghriba is a picturesque documentary about the 2,600-year-old Jewish community on the Tunisian island of Jerba, where Jews and Muslims live side-by-side peacefully.

Summary
According to local tradition, the first Jews settled on Jerba in the wake of the first Temple's destruction in Jerusalem in 566 BC. A community with true foundations in the Jewish life of the ancients, island tradition holds that its synagogue -– known as El Ghriba (“the miraculous”) — is built with a stone from the ruins of the First Temple, and houses the oldest known Sefer Torah in its sanctuary.

Waves of Jewish immigrants from around the Mediterranean flocked to it as a haven from persecution in the millennia that followed the original settlement. Upon arrival, they were greeted with a Jewish community that existed in surprising harmony with its local Muslim Berber neighbors.

Along their valued status as fully Tunisian, Jerba's Jews maintain a strong pride in their Judaism, and they revel in showing it. The film captures a yearly festival held just outside El Ghriba, commemorating two famous rabbis. The occasion is one of music and dancing, and helps continue the tradition of drawing Jews from around the world to Jerba –- if only for a visit. Such visitors have the reputation of leaving the island with a future husband or wife in tow.

And yet, the Jewish community is so utterly suffused with its Tunisian culture, that it is outwardly almost indistinguishable. Repeated shots of the wide variety of Jerba's residents reveal just how much both Jew and non-Jew in this millennia-old community share similarities in both physical appearance and their shared Arabic and French language.

But they retain individualizing brands of orthodoxy when it comes to their respective religions. Even though both communities share a love for couscous, vegetable dumplings and potato soup, because many of Jerba's Jews keep strictly kosher, they rarely share meals with Muslim neighbors.

Resources
The Jewish Channel's article

See also
Djerba
Islam and other religions
Projects working for peace among Arabs and Israelis
Other comparable Jewish films about the Diaspora:
Jews of Iran
Next Year in Argentina
In Search of Happiness

External links
The Jewish Channel

distributor's website
pictures of the synagogue

2001 films
Documentary films about Jews and Judaism
2001 documentary films
2000s English-language films